Seskar is an island in the Gulf of Finland, part of the Leningrad Oblast of Russia. The island was an independent municipality of Finland populated by Finns at least since 16th century, until World War II, when it was ceded to the Soviet Union following the 1940 Moscow Peace Treaty. 

Prior to the transfer of sovereignty to the Soviet Union, Seskar was also known by the name Siskar. The island has been involved in many shipwrecks over the centuries, including some ships sunk, wrecked or otherwise lost.

In 1777, a British ship "Mercey" was wrecked near the island. She was on a voyage from Saint Petersburg to London.

In 1802, a Russian ship "Roman Vasselevitch" was wrecked near the island. She was on a voyage from Saint Petersburg to London.

In 1807, a British ship "Nelly" was driven ashore on Seskar island. She was on a voyage from London to Saint Petersburg. "Nelly" was later refloated.

In 1815, a British ship "Graces" was wrecked by Seskar. The crew was rescued.

The municipality Seiskari had been formed from the Koivisto municipality in 1903, and belonged to the province of Viipuri and to the South Karelia region.

References

Sources
 Risto Hamari, Martti Korhonen, Timo Miettinen, Ilmar Talve: Suomenlahden ulkosaaret; Lavansaari, Seiskari, Suursaari, Tytärsaari, Jyväskylä 1996;  

Russian islands in the Baltic
Islands of Leningrad Oblast